Lake Claire can mean:

 Lake Claire (Alberta) - a lake in Alberta, Canada
 Lake Claire (Atlanta) - a neighborhood in Atlanta, Georgia, United States